Wolfgang Burba (born 31 July 1960 in Oberstdorf) is a former German curler and curling coach.

He is a former World men's runner-up, European men's curling champion and two-time German men's curling champion (1992, 1993; silver in 1995, 2016; bronze in 2015).

His brother Hans-Joachim Burba is a curler too and Wolfgang's longtime teammate.

Personal life
Burba is married and has one child.

Teams

Record as a coach of national teams

References

External links
 
 

1960 births
Living people
German male curlers
European curling champions
German curling champions
German curling coaches
People from Oberstdorf
Sportspeople from Swabia (Bavaria)